Carlos Agulló is a Spanish film director and editor awarded in numerous festivals, such as the Palm Springs International Film Festival, the São Paulo International Film Festival and the Hamptons International Film Festival.

Film career 
After graduating in Fine Arts from the Complutense University of Madrid, he started out as an editor's assistant to such well known editors as Lourdes Olaizola and Iván Aledo. His collaboration with Alejandro Amenábar on the Oscar-winning film The Sea Inside launched his career as a film editor, later working with other directors such as Mateo Gil, Oskar Santos, Sergio Candel and Jorge Sánchez-Cabezudo.

Parallel to his activity as an editor, he directed five short films until making his debut in feature-length directing with the multi-awarded South African documentary Plot for Peace. As a Director he has approached sensitive topics such as hospice care on his feature documentary All The Other Days or the March 2004 Madrid train bombings on his Amazon Original series The Challenge:11M.

Awards

Filmography 
Director

Editor

References

External links 
 

Spanish film directors
Spanish film editors
1974 births
Living people